Rick Leach and Andrei Olhovskiy were the defending champions, but Olhovskiy did not participate this year.  Leach partnered Jonathan Stark, losing in the first round.

Martin Damm and Cyril Suk won the title, defeating David Adams and Fabrice Santoro 6–4, 6–3 in the final.

Seeds

Draw

Draw

External links
Draw

Kremlin Cup
Kremlin Cup